In differential geometry, the Chen–Gackstatter surface family (or the Chen–Gackstatter–Thayer surface family) is a family of minimal surfaces that generalize the Enneper surface by adding handles, giving it nonzero topological genus.

They are not embedded, and have Enneper-like ends. It has been shown that  is the only  genus one orientable complete minimal surface of total curvature .

It has been conjectured that continuing to add handles to the surfaces will in the limit converge to the Scherk's second surface (for j = 1) or the saddle tower family for j > 1.

References

External links
 The Chen–Gackstatter Thayer Surfaces at the Scientific Graphics Project 
 Chen–Gackstatter Surface in the Minimal Surface Archive 
 Xah Lee's page on Chen–Gackstatter 

Minimal surfaces